Montiglio Monferrato is a comune in the Province of Asti in the Italian region Piedmont, located in the Valle Versa about  east of Turin and about  northwest of Asti. It was created in 1998 by combining the three communes of Colcavagno, Montiglio and Scandeluzza. The fourth principal population centre is the village of Rinco; this also was a commune in its own right until 1916 when it was absorbed by Scandeluzza.

Main sights
Montiglio is home to a castle from the 13th century during the war between the commune of Asti and the marquises of Montferrat, destroyed in 1305 and rebuilt with tunnels in the 14th century. The castle's park houses the Chapel of St. Andrew, with the largest cycle of 14th-century frescoes in Piedmont.

Other castles are at Colcavagno and Rinco.

The 18th-century town church in via Roma features frescoes by Pietro Ivaldi. The 17th-century church of San Rocco is found in Piazza Umberto. Piazza Umberto also has a market on Friday.

References

External links
 Official website

Cities and towns in Piedmont
Hilltowns in Piedmont